Lloyd Sandiford may refer to:

Sir Lloyd Erskine Sandiford (politician) (born March 24, 1937), 4th Prime Minister of Barbados
Decora (rapper) (born January 4, 1984 as Lloyd Gregory Sandiford), American AfroLatinX hip hop artist